Minoa is a genus of moths in the family Geometridae. The genus was described by Treitschke in 1825.

Species
 Minoa euthecta (Turner, 1904)
 Minoa murinata (Scopoli, 1763) – drab looper

References

External links

Asthenini